The Zara class was a group of four heavy cruisers built for the Italian Regia Marina (Royal Navy) in the late 1920s and the early 1930s. The ships were a substantial improvement over the preceding s, incorporating significantly heavier armor protection at the cost of the very high speed of the Trentos.

All four ships served with the main fleet in the interwar period, where they were primarily occupied with training exercises and fleet reviews. During the Spanish Civil War, Gorizia evacuated Italian nationals and Pola took part in non-intervention patrols. All four ships supported the Italian invasion of Albania in April 1939, shortly before the outbreak of World War II. After Italy joined the wider conflict in 1940, the four ships saw extensive action in the Mediterranean Sea against British forces. The ships took part in the battles of Calabria and Cape Matapan, and in the latter engagement, Zara, Pola, and Fiume were all sunk in a one-sided night action with three British battleships.

Gorizia continued in service, seeing further action at the First and Second Battles of Sirte. She was seriously damaged by American heavy bombers in April 1943 and towed to La Spezia, where she was still under repair when Italy surrendered in September. Germany seized the ship when they occupied the port, and Italian commandos unsuccessfully attempted to sink her in June 1944. In poor condition by the end of the war, the postwar Italian Navy decided to sell the ship for scrap in 1947.

Design
While the preceding  of heavy cruisers were still being built, elements of the Italian naval command began to doubt the effectiveness of the new vessels, which sacrificed armor protection in favor of very high speeds. The designers quickly found that these characteristics could not be incorporated into a vessel that remained within the  limit imposed by the Washington Naval Treaty. The naval command agreed to allow the new ships to exceed the displacement limits, but instructed the designers to eliminate unnecessary features to save as much weight as possible. As a result, the belt armor was reduced in thickness and the planned torpedo tubes were removed. The flush deck of the Trentos was abandoned, with the ships instead incorporating a forecastle deck and a stepped-down main deck. In addition, the Zara design would be powered by just two propellers driven by lightweight machinery, unlike the four-shaft arrangement used in the Trentos. Nevertheless, the ships still exceeded the displacement limit by at least . All four ships were named for formerly Austro-Hungarian cities that were annexed to Italy in the aftermath of World War I.

General characteristics

The first three ships were built with light superstructures as a weight saving measure, but Pola, intended to serve as a flagship, received a much larger bridge structure to accommodate an admiral's staff. All four ships received two tripod masts, with the forward mast erected over the bridge. They had a crew of 841 officers and enlisted men. The ships carried a pair of IMAM Ro.43 seaplanes for aerial reconnaissance; the hangar was located under the forecastle and a fixed catapult was mounted on the centerline at the bow.

The ships' power plant consisted of two Parsons steam turbines powered by eight oil-fired Thornycroft boilers, with the exception of Fiume, which received Yarrow boilers. The boilers were trunked into two funnels amidships.

Armament and armor

The Zaras were armed with a main battery of eight 203 mm Mod 29 53-caliber guns in four gun turrets. The turrets were arranged in superfiring pairs forward and aft. Each ship carried 157 shells per gun. Like the Trentos, the Zara-class ships suffered from shell dispersion that hampered accuracy. The problem was in large part due to poor quality control in Italian munition factories, which failed to ensure tight manufacturing tolerances necessary for accurate shells. In addition, the single cradle mounts required the guns to be very close together; this caused the shells to interfere with each other in flight and contributed to the dispersion problem.

Anti-aircraft defense was provided by a battery of sixteen  47-cal. guns in twin mounts, four Vickers-Terni  /39 guns in single mounts and eight  guns in twin mounts. The ships' secondary battery was revised several times during their careers. Two of the 100 mm guns and all of the 40 mm guns were removed in the late 1930s and eight  54-cal. guns were installed in their place. Two  15-cal. star shell guns were added in 1940. In 1942, the star shell guns aboard Gorizia, by this time the only surviving member of the class, were replaced with four more 37 mm guns. The following year, a battery of fourteen  guns in six twin and two single mounts replaced the  machine guns.

The ships were protected with an armored citadel that covered the ships' vitals, including the machinery spaces and ammunition magazines. The gun turrets had 150 mm thick plating on the faces and the barbettes they sat in were also 150 mm thick.

The Zara class carried three times the armor protection of the preceding Trentos. This additional armor would have made the ships decidedly nose-heavy, so to offset this the rear of the ship was raised by one deck behind the front funnel. The result was excellent watertight integrity and protection.

Ships

Service history

After entering service in the early 1930s, the four members of the Zara class took part in training exercises with the Italian fleet and participated in fleet reviews held for foreign leaders, including Adolf Hitler of Nazi Germany and Miklós Horthy, the Regent of Hungary. Gorizia and Pola were involved in the Spanish Civil War; in 1936 Pola conducted non-intervention patrols and Gorizia carried Italian nationals from Gijon, Spain, to Le Verdon-sur-Mer, France that year. After departing France, Gorizia visited Germany, and on the way back, she suffered a major explosion in an aviation gasoline tank that forced her to put into Gibraltar for repairs. There, British shipyard inspectors discovered that the ship was grossly over the Washington Treaty's displacement restriction. In March 1939, all four ships sortied to prevent a squadron of Republican warships from reaching the Black Sea, forcing them to stop in Bizerte, Tunisia, where they were interned. The following month, Zara, Pola, and Gorizia provided gunfire support to Italian forces invading Albania.

The Zara-class cruisers saw extensive service during World War II, having taken part in several sorties to catch British convoys in the Mediterranean as the flagship of the 1st Division. At the Battle of Calabria in July 1940, torpedo bombers from the British aircraft carrier  attacked the Zara-class cruisers, but they failed to score any hits. The ships steamed ahead to the front of the Italian line of battle and joined the attack on the leading British battleship, but they scored no hits. British cruisers attacked as the Italians withdrew, but heavy fire from the Italian cruisers drove them off. All four ships escaped damage at the Battle of Taranto in November 1940. Italian casualties were very heavy, with 783 killed aboard Zara, 328 killed aboard Pola, 812 aboard Fiume. The survivors, mostly from Pola, were rescued primarily by British destroyers, though Greek destroyers and an Italian hospital ship picked up others over the following few days.

Gorizia, the sole surviving member of the class, saw action at the First Battle of Sirte in December 1941 and Second Sirte in March 1942, where she was heavily engaged with British light cruisers and destroyers. As the action took place at very long range, neither side scored any hits. During this period, the ship also took part in convoy escort operations to supply Italian and German forces in North Africa. While the ship was moored in La Maddalena on 10 April 1943, a major attack from United States Army Air Forces heavy bombers sank the heavy cruiser  and hit Gorizia with three bombs, inflicting serious damage. She was still under repair in La Spezia when Italy surrendered to the Allies in September, and she was seized by German forces when they occupied much of the country. On 22 June 1944, Italian frogmen used Chariot manned torpedoes to enter the harbor and sink Gorizia and the heavy cruiser , which was also out of service due to battle damage, to prevent them from being used as blockships though Gorizia survived the attack. She was nevertheless sold for scrap in 1947, since it would have been cost-prohibitive to repair her.

Notes

References

External links

 Zara (1930) Marina Militare website

Cruiser classes
World War II cruisers of Italy